Tea Time for the Traditionally Built, published in 2009, is the tenth in The No. 1 Ladies' Detective Agency series of novels by Alexander McCall Smith, set in Gaborone, Botswana, and featuring the Motswana protagonist Precious Ramotswe.

Plot summary

Mma Ramotswe and her assistant Mma Makutsi agree that there are things that men know and ladies do not, and vice versa. The glamorous Violet Sephotho sets her sights on Mma Makutsi's unsuspecting fiancé and it becomes clear that some men do not know how to recognise a ruthless Jezebel even when she is bouncing up and down on the best bed in the Double Comfort Furniture Shop.

In her attempt to foster understanding between the sexes and find the traitor on Mr Football's team, Mma Ramotswe ventures into new territory, with the help of an observant small boy.

Cases
Mma Ramotswe's newest client is the big-shot owner of the ailing football club, the Kalahari Swoopers, but the lady detectives know very little about football.

Subplots

Mma Ramotswe's old white van is dying. She is not ready to give up on it. JLB gets her a new, but boring, van and as grateful as she is, she sets out to find her old van. But to make this complicated her van was stolen from the buyer, making it harder to find.

Themes
This novel is concerned with themes of loyalty, relations between the sexes and often the need to dig deep to uncover the goodness of the human heart.

2009 British novels
The No. 1 Ladies' Detective Agency
Novels by Alexander McCall Smith
Little, Brown and Company books